Les Fleurs du Mal is a cover album and the fifteenth full-length album by Swedish symphonic metal band Therion. It was released on 28 September 2012 to celebrate the 25th anniversary of the band. Named after the 1857 volume of poetry Les Fleurs du mal, the album is fully sung in French language. It consist of metal cover versions of French pop songs from 1960s and 1970s, mostly from the ye-ye genre.

Production 
The album was financed by Christofer Johnsson who considers the album a part of an art project. It was made available for pre-order at Therion's webstore on 2 September 2012. Johnsson announced that the version sold at concerts with a different cover, would include a bonus track and a poster, and that his "aim is to sign and personally dedicate every single one of them at the shows".

Track listing

Personnel
The album was recorded by the following artists:

Band
Lori Lewis - soprano and main vocals
Thomas Vikström - tenor and main vocals
Christofer Johnsson - rhythm guitars, synthesizers, Hammond organ and programming, of tubular bells, timpani, clarinet, double bass and harp. Arrangements, audio engineer and record producer.
Christian Vidal - solo guitars, electric sitar
Nalle "Grizzly" Påhlsson – 4 and 8 string bass guitars
Johan Kullberg - drums

Guest musicians
Snowy Shaw - vocals in "Initials B.B." and "Dis-moi Poupee"
Mari Paul - vocals on "Mon Amour, Mon Ami"
Johanna Najla - vocals on "Initials B.B."
Mattias Olsson - synthesizers, mellotron and percussion on "En Alabama", "Mon Amour, Mon Ami" and "Lilith"
Mattias Torrel - acoustic guitars on "Mon Amour, Mon Ami" and "La Licorne D'or"
Stefan Jernståhl - accordion on  "Wahala Manitou"
 Violin
 Anders Åkered
 Fredrik Syberg
 Hanna Ekström
 Isa Holmesund
 Lars Wehlin
 Natalia Migdal
 Cello
 Anna Manell
 Pär Lindqvist
 Horn
 Eva-Tea Lundberg
 Ida Freji
 Johan Ahlin
 Magnus Wretblad
 Trombone
 Kristoffer Siggstedt
 Magnus Werner
 Staffan Findin
 Erik Rodell – oboe
 Rolf Pilotti – flute
 Johan Norin – trumpet

References 

Therion (band) albums
2012 albums
Self-released albums